Huddesford is a surname, and may refer to:

 George Huddesford (1749–1809), cleric, painter and satirical poet in Oxford
 George Huddesford (academic) (c.1699–1776), academic administrator and museum keeper at the University of Oxford
 William Huddesford (1732—1772), curator of the Ashmolean Museum from 1755 to 1772